James D. Dee   was a Major League Baseball player who played shortstop for the 1884 Pittsburgh Alleghenys.  He continued to play in the minor leagues through 1888.

External links

1864 births
1897 deaths
Major League Baseball shortstops
Pittsburgh Alleghenys players
19th-century baseball players
Scranton Miners players
Albany Governors players
Zanesville Kickapoos players
Bradford (minor league baseball) players
Sunbury (minor league baseball) players
Mt. Carmel (minor league baseball) players
Shamokin Maroons players
Baseball players from New York (state)